"Porpoise Song" is a song written by Gerry Goffin and Carole King and performed by the Monkees as the theme song for their 1968 film Head and its accompanying soundtrack album.  The single version runs more than a minute longer than does the album version. The song also appears on several Monkees greatest-hits albums.

Film appearance
In the Monkees' 1968 feature film Head, the song appears at the beginning and at the end of the production. At the start of the film, the group are being chased, running onto a bridge. In an attempt to escape, Dolenz jumps from the bridge as the others look on in shock. As Dolenz sinks, he is saved from drowning by a couple of beautiful mermaids. At the end of the film, the other members follow Dolenz and jump or fall from the bridge. As they appear to swim to shore, they end up in a large water tank. Solarization visual effects are used on screen to mirror the psychedelic nature of the song's lyrics.

Background
The song's lyrics and melody echo the psychedelic vibe of mid-1960s rock music. Micky Dolenz provides the vocals, which are distorted by an echoing effect, and a mix of organ riffs, cello, string-bass, woodwinds and horns float in and out of the song. It also includes chimes, tubular bells and aquatic sound effects. The lyrics call into question the order of the world and one's place therein, and there are also veiled in-joke references to Dolenz’s childhood work as the star of the television series Circus Boy.

The song was produced by its cowriter Gerry Goffin on February 26, 28 and 29 of 1968. In his 2005 book The Monkees: The Day-by-Day Story of the 60s TV Pop Sensation, Andrew Sandoval wrote: "Without a doubt, this is the most elaborate production ever for a Monkees recording."

According to Bob Rafelson:

Cash Box said that it has a "'progressive' feel" and "a thundering rhythm line akin to the Beatles' 'I Am the Walrus.'"

Chart history
"Porpoise Song" was released as a single in 1968 and reached #62 on the Billboard Hot 100.

Covers by other artists 
 1987: Steaming Coils on the album Never Creak
 1988: Bongwater on the 7" limited-edition single "You Don't Love Me Yet", Shimmy 7-98
 1995: Trouble on the album Plastic Green Head
 1996: Wondermints on the album Wonderful World of The Wondermints
 1997: The Lightning Seeds as a B-side to the single "Sugar Coated Iceberg"
 1999: The Church on the album A Box of Birds
 2000: The Grapes of Wrath on the album Extended Field Trip 
 2003: DJ Nobody (also known as Elvin Estela, later of Blank Blue) on the album Pacific Drift: Western Water Music, Vol. 1
 2004: ...And You Will Know Us By the Trail of Dead, both live and on their 2004 EP Worlds Apart
 2010 Andrew WK, live
 2014: Django Django, as part of the "Late Night Tales" series
 2014: Progressive rock band Glass Hammer, on the album Ode to Echo
 2014 - 2015: The Polyphonic Spree, Live

Popular culture
The song was featured in Vanilla Sky, a 2001 film starring Tom Cruise, Penélope Cruz and Cameron Diaz.
The song was also heard during the Mad Men Season 6 episode "The Quality of Mercy."

References

1968 singles
The Monkees songs
Songs with lyrics by Gerry Goffin
Songs written for films
Songs written by Carole King
1968 songs
Film theme songs
Porpoises
American psychedelic rock songs
Songs about mammals